One More Kiss is a Scottish romantic drama directed by Vadim Jean, starring Valerie Edmond, Gerard Butler and James Cosmo. The film’s story revolves around a cancer-diagnosed woman who decides to live her remaining life to the full, which includes throwing herself into a love triangle with an old flame.

Plot
When Sarah Hopson (Valerie Edmond) discovers she has brain-stem carcinomas (a brain tumour), she leaves her successful high-rise lifestyle in New York City, returning to her hometown in the Scottish Borders, as she has little time left to live.

That is where Sarah left her widowed father Frank (James Cosmo) and her childhood sweetheart Sam (Gerard Butler) to pursue a career in the United States seven years ago. Her father's house is right behind the sea wall and the beach in Berwick, a border town between Scotland and England. Frank has spent these years essentially sitting around waiting to die. So she tries to mend things with her physically present but emotionally unexpressive dad. Sarah's return forces him to start living again.

Upon arriving Sarah finds out that Sam, a restauranteur, is now happily married to Charlotte (Valerie Gogan). This, however, does not prevent her from asking a last favour – to permit Sarah to spend her remaining time in the company of the only man she has ever loved. Charlotte is not supportive but Sam does it anyway. He still loves her, and arranges to spend as much time with her as possible doing many of the things she always wanted to do before she dies.

Sam is a rare man who shows true compassion for the young girl suffering from cancer. Her bucket list includes flying a kite, skydiving, seeing the pyramids, etc. The more time they spend together the closer they become, as they recall past memories.

We see inside a therapy group for cancer sufferers, and meet a 24 year old guy who rages because he never had a chance to do anything with his life. We see Sarah go through a range of emotions as she faces her mortality. She teaches not to take life for granted and to live it to the fullest.

Sarah even prepares a speech, which she records, to be shown at the reception after her funeral. And she asks Sam (as he is a chef) to prepare a meal for 30 of her dearest friends and relatives. In Sarah’s videoed farewell speech, she asks them not to cry, and says to seize the day, quoting Dylan Thomas, "Do not go gentle into that good night. Rage, rage against the dying of the light."

The story is a quiet, gentle one. It doesn’t focus on sickness or death but on life, and tells you to make every day count, to get out of life all you can, while you still can.

Cast

Valerie Edmond as Sarah
Gerard Butler as Sam
James Cosmo as Frank
Valerie Gogan as Charlotte
Carl Proctor as Barry
Danny Nussbaum as Jude
Dilys Miller as Mary
Ron Guthrie as Robin
R Gary Robson as Gary the kitchen porter
Michael Murray as Market stall holder
Lori Manningham as Michael Angello, Frank’s dog
Hugh Wilson as Frank’s false teeth
Robin Galloway as Shirley (voice) (as Robyn Calloway)
Oscar Fullane as Chef (as Oscar Fullone)
Simon Tickner as Chef
Julian Jensen as Opera singer
Kim Hicks (and Tim Francis) as Opera lovers on stage
Nigel Pegram as Opera buff
Andrew Townsley as Doctor Frith (as Andrew Townley)
Collette King as Nurse King
Molly Maher as Young Sarah

Filming locations
 Edinburgh, Scotland
 Berwick upon Tweed, Northumberland, England, United Kingdom
 New York City, New York, United States

The original intention was for the film to be set in Jean’s home town of Bristol, but ultimately the landscapes of Northern England and Edinburgh, Scotland were used instead – with the former being the main setting. The opening and closing sequences were shot in New York City.

Music and soundtrack
"Amor Ti Vieta" – Tito Beltrán
"Ave Maria" – Slava
"Beautiful Dreamer" – James Cosmo
"Caruso" – Julian Jensen
"Hey Boy! Hey Girl!" – Louis Prima
"How About You" – Connie Lush
"Roses from the South" – Royal Philharmonic Orchestra
"Swimmers" – Mylo
"Through the Rain" – Gavin Clarke and Paul Bacon
"Where Do You Go To (My Lovely)" – Peter Sarstedt
"You Fascinating You (Tu Solamente Tu)" – Connie Lush

Release

Awards

Trivia
Despite its strong subject matter and an all-Scottish cast, One More Kiss was not included in the programme of the Edinburgh International Film Festival. It held its British premiere at the London Film Festival instead.
Jean did not deliberately pick an all-Scottish cast.
An army of local people volunteered as extras, and the Mayor of Berwick gave up his parking space for the production vehicle.

References

External links
 BFI - One More Kiss Review
Theiapolis Cinema - OMK
Gerard Butler, OMK
 Gerard Butler Global Fan Club

 

2000 films
2000 romantic drama films
British romantic drama films
Scottish drama films
Films directed by Vadim Jean
Films scored by John Murphy (composer)
Films about death
Films set in Scotland
Films shot in Edinburgh
Films shot in New York City
Films shot in Northumberland
2000s British films